Nicklas Kulti and Mikael Tillström were the defending champions but did not compete that year.

Karsten Braasch and Jens Knippschild won in the final 7–6(7–3), 4–6, 7–6(7–5) against Simon Aspelin and Andrew Kratzmann.

Seeds

  Joshua Eagle /  Andrew Florent (first round)
  Mariano Hood /  Sebastián Prieto (first round)
  Simon Aspelin /  Andrew Kratzmann (final)
  Karsten Braasch /  Jens Knippschild (champions)

Draw

External links
 2001 Telenordia Swedish Open Doubles Draw

Men's Doubles
Doubles